"Grand Finale" is a song by rappers DMX, Ja Rule, Method Man and Nas. It is first single from the soundtrack to the 1998 film, Belly. The single made it to number 63 on the Hot R&B/Hip-Hop Singles & Tracks and number 18 on the Hot Rap Singles. A remix to the song features rapper Vita.

"Grand Finale" samples "Kamurshol" by N.W.A.

Charts

References 

1998 singles
DMX (rapper) songs
Method Man songs
Nas songs
Ja Rule songs
Song recordings produced by Erick Sermon
Def Jam Recordings singles
1998 songs
Songs written by Nas
Songs written by Irv Gotti
Songs written by MC Ren
Songs written by DMX (rapper)
Songs written by Method Man
Songs written by Dr. Dre